Veronika Holletz (born 25 June 1945 in Berlin) is a retired East German swimmer who won the bronze medal in the 100m backstroke at the 1962 European Aquatics Championships. She also participated in the 1964 Summer Olympics as a member of the United Team of Germany and finished fourth in the 400m medley.

References

1945 births
Living people
German female swimmers
Olympic swimmers of the United Team of Germany
Swimmers at the 1964 Summer Olympics
European Aquatics Championships medalists in swimming
German female backstroke swimmers